Cerrena zonata is a species of poroid fungus in the genus Cerrena (Family: Polyporaceae).

Taxonomy
The fungus was first described scientifically by Miles Joseph Berkeley in 1854 as Irpex zonatus. In 1992, Leif Ryvarden moved it to Antrodia, a wastebasket taxon containing morphologically similar species. It was transferred to the genus Cerrena in 2014.

Habitat and distribution
Cerrena zonata is a white rot fungus that grows on dead hardwoods. In Asia, it has been recorded from India to Thailand, Vietnam, China, Far East Russia, and Japan. It is also in New Zealand, Australia, and Argentina.

References

Fungi described in 1854
Fungi of Asia
Fungi of Australia
Fungi of New Zealand
Polyporaceae
Fungi of South America
Taxa named by Miles Joseph Berkeley